Natsworthy is a surname. Notable people with the surname include:

 none

Fictional characters
 Hester Shaw, later Hester Natsworthy, fictional wife of fictional character Tom Natsworthy in the Mortal Engines series